13 (thirteen) is the natural number following 12 and preceding 14.

Strikingly folkloric aspects of the number 13 have been noted in various cultures around the world: one theory is that this is due to the cultures employing lunar-solar calendars (there are approximately 12.41 lunations per solar year, and hence 12 "true months" plus a smaller, and often portentous, thirteenth month). This can be witnessed, for example, in the "Twelve Days of Christmas" of Western European tradition.

In mathematics
The number 13 is the sixth prime number. It is a twin prime with 11, as well as a cousin prime with 17. It is the second Wilson prime, of three known (the others being 5 and 563), and the smallest emirp in decimal.

13 is:

The second star number:

The third centered square number:

 A happy number and a lucky number.
A Fibonacci number, preceded by 5 and 8.
The smallest number whose fourth power can be written as a sum of two consecutive square numbers (1192 + 1202).
The sum and the difference of 2 consecutive squares: 13 = (22 + 32) = (72 - 62).

Also,

There are 13 different ways for the three fastest horses in a horse race to finish, allowing for ties, a fact that can be expressed mathematically by 13 being the third ordered Bell number.
Since 52 + 122 = 132, (5, 12, 13) forms a Pythagorean triple, and as such represent the sides of a right triangle.
A 13-sided regular polygon is called a tridecagon.
There are 13 hexagonal isohedral tilings. 
There are 13 distinct cubic distance-regular graphs, of which the Platonic Tetrahedral graph and Dodecahedral graph are part.
There are 13 Archimedean solids without counting enantiomorphic forms. Some also include the Elongated square gyrobicupola as another Archimedean solid.
There are 13 architectonic honeycombs: 8 originate from the  cubic group and 5 originate from the  alternated cubic group and  cyclic group. The 13 dual honeycombs to these are the 13 catoptric honeycombs, which are made of 13 types of stereohedra.
A standard torus can be sliced into 13 pieces with just 3 plane cuts.
There are 13 particular Coxeter groups that generate uniform prismatic tessellations in Euclidean 4-space.
There are 13 collections of subsets of {1, 2} that are closed under union and intersection.

List of basic calculations

In science
The atomic number of aluminium is 13.

In languages

Grammar

 In all Germanic languages, 13 is the first compound number; the numbers 11 and 12 have their own names.
 The Romance languages use different systems: In Italian, 11 is the first compound number, as in Romanian, while in Spanish and Portuguese, the numbers up to and including 15 (Spanish , Portuguese ), and in French up to and including 16 have their own names. This is also the case in most Slavic languages, Hindi-Urdu and other South Asian languages.

Folklore 
In Germany, according to an old tradition, 13, as the first compound number, was the first number written in digits; the numbers 0 through 12 were spelled out. The Duden (the German standard dictionary) now calls this tradition (which was actually never written down as an official rule) outdated and no longer valid, but many writers still follow it.

In English 
Thirteen is one of two numbers within the teen numerical range (13–19), along with fifteen, not derived by cardinal numeral (three) and the teen suffix; instead, it is derived from the ordinal numeral (third).

In religion

Islam 
In Shia, 13 signifies the 13th day of the month of Rajab (the Lunar calendar), which is the birth of Imam Ali. 13 also is a total of 1 Prophet and 12 Shia Imams in the Islamic School of Thought.

Catholicism
The apparitions of the Virgin of Fátima in 1917 were claimed to occur on the 13th day of six consecutive months.

In Catholic devotional practice, the number thirteen is also associated with Saint Anthony of Padua, since his feast day falls on June 13. A traditional devotion called the Thirteen Tuesdays of St. Anthony involves praying to the saint every Tuesday over a period of thirteen weeks. Another devotion, St. Anthony's Chaplet, consists of thirteen decades of three beads each.

Sikhism
According to famous Sakhi (Evidence) or story of Guru Nanak Dev Ji, when he was an accountant at a town of Sultanpur Lodhi, he was distributing groceries to people. When he gave groceries to the 13th person, he stopped because in Gurmukhi and Hindi the word 13 is called Terah, which means yours. And Guru Nanak Dev Ji kept saying, "Yours, yours, yours..." remembering God. People reported to the emperor that Guru Nanak Dev Ji was giving out free food to the people. When treasures were checked, there was more money than before.

The Vaisakhi, which commemorates the creation of "Khalsa" or pure Sikh was celebrated on April 13 for many years.

Judaism
 In Judaism, 13 signifies the age at which a boy matures and becomes a Bar Mitzvah, i.e., a full member of the Jewish faith (counts as a member of Minyan).
 The number of principles of Jewish faith according to Maimonides.
 According to Rabbinic commentary on the Torah, God has 13 Attributes of Mercy.

Zoroastrianism
Since beginning of the Nowruz tradition, the 13th day of each new Iranian year is called Sizdah Be-dar, a festival dedicated to pranks and spending time outdoors.

Confucianism
 The Thirteen Classics is considered to be a part of the Chinese classics.

Aztec mythology 
According to Aztec mythology, the Thirteen Heavens were formed by the gods from the head of Cipactli during creation.

Wicca
A common tradition in the religion Wicca holds that the number of members for a coven is ideally thirteen, though this tradition is not universal.

Luck

Bad

The number 13 is considered an unlucky number in some countries. The end of the Mayan calendar's 13th Baktun was superstitiously feared as a harbinger of the apocalyptic 2012 phenomenon. Fear of the number 13 has a specifically recognized phobia, triskaidekaphobia, a word first recorded in 1911. The superstitious sufferers of triskaidekaphobia try to avoid bad luck by keeping away from anything numbered or labelled thirteen. As a result, companies and manufacturers use another way of numbering or labelling to avoid the number, with hotels and tall buildings being conspicuous examples (thirteenth floor). It is also considered unlucky to have thirteen guests at a table. Friday the 13th has been considered an unlucky day.

There are a number of theories as to why the number thirteen became associated with bad luck, but none of them have been accepted as likely.
The Last Supper At Jesus Christ's Last Supper, there were thirteen people around the table, counting Christ and the twelve apostles. Some believe this is unlucky because one of those thirteen, Judas Iscariot, was the betrayer of Jesus Christ. From the 1890s, a number of English language sources relate the "unlucky" thirteen to an idea that at the Last Supper, Judas, the disciple who betrayed Jesus, was the 13th to sit at the table.
Knights Templar On Friday, 13 October 1307, King Philip IV of France ordered the arrest of the Knights Templar, and most of the knights were tortured and killed.
Full moons A year with 13 full moons instead of 12 posed problems for the monks in charge of the calendars. "This was considered a very unfortunate circumstance, especially by the monks who had charge of the calendar of thirteen months for that year, and it upset the regular arrangement of church festivals. For this reason, thirteen came to be considered an unlucky number." However, a typical century has about 37 years that have 13 full moons, compared to 63 years with 12 full moons, and typically every third or fourth year has 13 full moons.
A suppressed lunar cult In ancient cultures, the number 13 represented femininity, because it corresponded to the number of lunar (menstrual) cycles in a year. The theory is that, as the solar calendar triumphed over the lunar, the number thirteen became anathema.
Hammurabi's code There is a myth that the earliest reference to thirteen being unlucky or evil is in the Babylonian Code of Hammurabi (circa 1780 BC), where the thirteenth law is said to be omitted. In fact, the original Code of Hammurabi has no numeration. The translation by L.W. King (1910), edited by Richard Hooker, omitted one article: If the seller have gone to (his) fate (i. e., have died), the purchaser shall recover damages in said case fivefold from the estate of the seller. Other translations of the Code of Hammurabi, for example the translation by Robert Francis Harper, include the 13th article.

Good

France: 13 was traditionally considered a lucky number in France prior to the First World War, and was used in numerical form as a good luck symbol on postcards and charms.
Italy: 13 was the lucky number in the Italian football pools (Totocalcio). The Italian expression  (literally, "make thirteen") means to hit the jackpot.
United States: Colgate University also considers 13 a lucky number. They were founded in 1819 by 13 men with 13 dollars, 13 prayers and 13 articles. (To this day, members of the Colgate community consider the number 13 a good omen.) In fact, the campus address is 13 Oak Drive in Hamilton, New York, and the male a cappella group is called the Colgate 13.

Other

In the Mayan Tzolk'in calendar, trecenas mark cycles of 13-day periods. The pyramids are also set up in 9 steps divided into 7 days and 6 nights, 13 days total.

In the standard 52-card deck of playing cards there are four suits, each of 13 ranks.

A baker's dozen, devil's dozen, long dozen, or long measure is 13, one more than a standard dozen. The thirteenth loaf is called the vantage loaf because it is considered advantageous overall to get 13 loaves for the price of 12.

In Arthurian legend, which was recorded in Medieval texts, King Arthur is resting in Avalon with the twelve greatest knights of the Round Table, totalling 13, and will return when his country is in peril.

The Thirteen Treasures of Britain are a series of magical items listed in late Medieval texts.

The Thirteen Postures of Tai Chi are thirteen postures (consisting of Eight Gates and Five Steps) which are considered to be of fundamental importance in the practice of Tai Chi.

In astronomy there are 13 star constellations in the zodiac (including Ophiuchus); this can be compared with astrology where there are 12 signs of the zodiac.

In Judaism, 13 signifies the age at which a boy matures and becomes a Bar Mitzvah, i.e., a full member of the Jewish faith (counts as a member of Minyan). The number of principles of Jewish faith according to Maimonides. According to Rabbinic commentary on the Torah, God has 13 Attributes of Mercy.

In a tarot card deck, XIII is the card of Death, usually picturing the Pale Horse with its rider.

Age 13
In Judaism, thirteen signifies the age at which a boy matures and becomes a Bar Mitzvah, i.e., a full member of the Jewish faith (is qualified to be counted as a member of Minyan).
Thirteen is the minimum age of consent in Argentina, Burkina Faso, Japan, Niger, and two Mexican states.
On many social media platforms in the United States, 13 is the standard minimum age to be allowed to create an account in compliance with the Children's Online Privacy Protection Act (COPPA).
This is the age at which the Entertainment Software Rating Board (ESRB) assesses for T-rated games and the Motion Picture Association recommends movies with a PG-13 rating.

History 

The United States of America was created from thirteen British colonies and as such, the number thirteen is a commonly recurring motif in American heraldry. For example, there are thirteen stars on the Great Seal of the United States and there are thirteen stripes on the American flag.
The first flag of the United States bore thirteen stripes, alternating red and white, and thirteen white stars in the blue union. The thirteen stripes represented the Thirteen Colonies from which the United States was created, and the thirteen stars represented the number of states in the new nation.  When two new states were added to the Union in 1795, the flag bore fifteen stars and fifteen stripes.  With the addition of five new states in 1818, the number of stripes was re-set and permanently fixed at thirteen.
The Great Seal of the United States bears many images of the number thirteen, representing the Thirteen Colonies from which the United States was created.  On the Seal's obverse, the overhead glory bears thirteen stars. The chest shield in front of the spread eagle bears thirteen stripes (seven white and six red). The eagle's right talon holds the Olive Branch of Peace, bearing thirteen olives and thirteen olive leaves. The eagle's left talon holds the Weapons of War, consisting of thirteen arrows. The eagle's mouth holds a scroll bearing the national motto "E Pluribus Unum" (which, by coincidence, consists of thirteen letters).  On the Seal's reverse, the unfinished pyramid consists of thirteen levels.
The Thirteenth Amendment to the United States Constitution abolished slavery and involuntary servitude (except as a punishment for crime).
Apollo 13 was a NASA Moon mission famous for being a "successful failure" in 1970.

In sports
 The number 13 was not used in the Indianapolis 500 from 1915 to 2002. It was not permitted for use between 1926 and 2002. In 2009, E. J. Viso, driving for HVM Racing in the 2009 IndyCar Series season, drove a green number 13 car full-time, despite terrible superstitions about it in motorsports.
 The number 13 was not used in Formula One from 1977 to 2013.
 In rugby league:
 Each side has 13 players on the field at any given time.
 The jersey number 13 is worn by the starting loose forward or lock forward in most competitions. An exception is in the Super League, which uses static squad numbering.
 In rugby union, the jersey number 13 is worn by the outside centre.
 In triathlon, the number 13 is not used. As such, the numbering goes 11, 12, 14, 15 under the current numbering system.
In Petanque, standard games are won when a team reaches the score of 13 points. A 13–0 score is called Fanny.
 Effective with the 2020 season, Major League Baseball teams are allowed no more than 13 pitchers on their active rosters at any time during the season. The main exception is from September 1 to the end of the regular season, when this number increases to 14.
 In NCAA Division I men's college basketball, teams are allowed to provide scholarships to no more than 13 players at any given time.

In TV, films and literature
13th, a 2016 documentary.
13 (musical), a 2007 musical.
13 (film), an English-language remake of the 2005 French film 13 Tzameti.
Thirteen (film), a 2003 American film.
Thirteen (TV series), a 2016 British five-part police drama.
Number 13 (film), an uncompleted Hitchcock 1922 film.
13 Tzameti, a 2005 French film ("Tzameti" means "13" in Georgian).
13 Ghosts is a 1960 horror film.
Thirteen Ghosts is a 2001 remake.
Thirteen is the nickname of Dr. Remy Hadley on the American medical drama House played by Olivia Wilde.
13 Assassins is a 2010 film by Japanese director Takashi Miike.
The Thirteen is a 1936 Soviet war film by Mikhail Romm.
The 13th Warrior is a 1999 historical fiction action film starring Antonio Banderas.
District 13 is a 2004 French film (with David Belle).
Apollo 13 is a 1995 American film.
Warehouse 13 is a television show about the 13th warehouse in the line of warehouses that store supernatural artifacts.
Friday the 13th is a horror film series involving a mass murderer named Jason Voorhees.
Friday the 13th: The Series is a syndicated American-Canadian horror television series, that originally ran from 1987 to 1990. 
The 13 Ghosts of Scooby-Doo:  Seventh incarnation of the Hanna-Barbera Scooby-Doo cartoon franchise, first run 1985–1986.
The Thirteenth Floor is a 1999 sci-fi film.
Golgo 13, centered around a self-titled assassin, is the oldest manga still in publication. It is the second or third best selling manga in history.
13B/Yaavarum Nalam is a 2009 Hindi/Tamil Horror movie starring R Madhavan.
Thirteen Reasons Why is a novel containing 13 tapes received by a student learning of his classmate's suicide.
The Thirteenth Doctor, the 13th incarnation of the titular character of Doctor Who, played by Jodie Whittaker.
In The Hobbit, the Company of Thorin Oakenshield consists of 13 Dwarves trying to reclaim their homeland from the dragon Smaug (Thorin Oakenshield, Fíli, Kíli, Óin, Glóin, Balin, Dwalin, Bifur, Bofur, Bombur, Dori, Nori and Ori).
In The Wheel of Time series, there were 13 Forsaken (Chosen) sealed away with their master, the Dark One, at the end of the Age of Legends, and later released in the Third Age (Aginor, Asmodean, Balthamel, Be'lal, Demandred, Graendal, Ishamael, Lanfear, Mesaana, Moghedien, Rahvin, Sammael and Semirhage).
13 Going On 30 is a 2004 romantic comedy film.

See also

 List of highways numbered 13

References

Integers
Numerology
Superstitions about numbers